Citadel LLC (formerly known as Citadel Investment Group, LLC) is an American multinational hedge fund and financial services company. Founded in 1990 by Ken Griffin, it has more than $62 billion in assets under management . The company has over 2,600 employees, with corporate headquarters in Miami, Florida, and offices throughout North America, Asia, and Europe. Founder, CEO and Co-CIO Griffin owns approximately 85% of the firm.

Citadel LLC is a separate entity from the market maker Citadel Securities, although both were founded and are owned by Griffin.

History 
Kenneth Griffin started his trading career out of his dorm room at Harvard University in 1987, trading convertible bonds. As a sophomore, he hooked a satellite dish to the roof of his dormitory. After graduating with a degree in economics, Griffin joined Chicago-based hedge fund Glenwood Partners. Citadel was started with $4.6 million in capital. Citadel was originally named Wellington Financial Group after its flagship fund. The company name was changed to Citadel in 1994. Within eight years, the firm had more than $2 billion in assets under management.

In 1998, Citadel started requiring investors to accept terms that "significantly restrict[ed] their ability to withdraw their capital", according to Institutional Investor. When hedge fund Long Term Capital Management collapsed later that year, Citadel's capital lockdown made it "a rare buyer, as desperate hedge funds unloaded bond inventory". In 2006, Citadel and JP Morgan Chase took over the energy portfolio and division of failed hedge fund Amaranth Advisors, which had suffered a 65% ($6 billion) loss in assets. In November 2006 Citadel issued $2 billion of investment grade bonds to borrow money at a lower rate than it would otherwise be able to.

In 2001, Griffin began recruiting the energy traders from Enron the day after it collapsed for a new business including "a team of traders, meteorologists and researchers" building amongst the industries biggest energy trading groups at the time.

In 2007, Citadel invested $2.5 billion in E-Trade. This transaction included acquiring E-Trade's securitized subprime mortgages, collateralized debt obligations (CDOs) and second lien loans, as well as 12.5% senior unsecured notes, and 84,687,686 shares of common stock (equal to 19.99% of the then currently outstanding shares). Citadel received a seat on the board of directors. Citadel sold its remaining stake in E*Trade in 2013.

During the financial crisis of 2007–2008, for 10 months, Griffin barred his investors from withdrawing money, attracting criticism. At the peak of the crisis, the firm was losing "hundreds of millions of dollars each week". It was leveraged 7:1 and the biggest funds at Citadel finished 2008 down 55%. However, they rebounded with a 62% return in 2009.

On January 17, 2012, Citadel's flagship funds, Citadel Kensington Global Strategies Fund Ltd and Citadel Wellington LLC, crossed their respective high watermarks, earning back the 50% of assets lost during the 2008 financial crisis. Having made up the losses, Citadel could once again charge client fees for managing their money and take a percentage of profits. Citadel under Griffin's leadership was reported as differentiating from hedge funds rivals post-2008 financial crisis with an "aggressive expansion." Starting at the beginning of 2014, over an 18 months period the hedge fund's assets under management increased $10 billion; from $16 billion to $26 billion as a result of "a 29% rise for its main hedge funds and a flow of new cash." In January 2020, Citadel Securities paid a $97 million settlement to China, after Chinese regulators ended a long-standing investigation into Citadel and other companies.

During the coronavirus pandemic Citadel LLC created a "bubble" for a class of 100 interns by renting out a luxury resort in Wisconsin.

In January 2021, Citadel and Point72 Asset Management invested $2.75 billion in Melvin Capital, after Melvin Capital lost 53% of its value owing to the GameStop short squeeze.

In a letter to employees on June 23, 2022, Griffin announced they would be moving their headquarters to Miami, Florida, due to a more favorable business climate and increased crime complaints in Chicago.

Activities

Citadel 
As of January 2016, Citadel managed more than $29 billion in capital and was one of the world's largest asset managers. Citadel ranks as the eleventh largest hedge fund manager in the world, and in 2006 the second largest multi-strategy hedge fund globally. Citadel's group of hedge funds rank among the largest and most successful hedge funds in the world.

In 2014, Citadel became the first foreign hedge fund to complete a yuan fundraising as part of a program to allow Chinese investors to invest in overseas hedge funds.

In 2021, Citadel ranked second among the top money managers for net gains.

In 2022, Citadel's hedge fund unit posted its record year of revenues to date, generating about $28 billion in revenue. Citadel returned $16 billion to its clients in 2022, which was a record annual return for both the fund of American investor Kenneth Griffin and the entire industry. In addition, this allowed Citadel to overtake Bridgewater in the list of the most profitable hedge funds in history according to experts from LCH Investments.

Investment strategies 
Citadel manages funds across five different investment strategies including equities, commodities, fixed income, quantitative strategies, and credit.

Reinsurance 
Citadel wanted to allocate the investment capital with its two funds, Kensington Global Strategies Fund Ltd and Citadel Wellington LLC, to investments that the company thought to be uncorrelated to their other investment strategies. To achieve this move, Citadel, through capitalization via their funds, entered the reinsurer industry, which provides insurance companies with their own policies to spread the risk of losses that they have given to their customers, in 2004 by founding CIG Reinsurance Ltd (CIG Re), a Bermuda-based catastrophe reinsurer providing $450 million in capital. Citadel additionally founded $500 million reinsurer New Castle Re in 2005, seeking to capitalize on rising prices for reinsurance in the wake of Hurricane Katrina's damage to property coverage costs. In 2006, Citadel's two funds had approximately 10 percent of its assets invested in reinsurance.

Citadel wound down CIG Re in November 2008 because the company could not achieve a financial strength rating, and as a result could not compete in comparison to other companies in the industry. Meanwhile, New Castle Re remained open and received an 'A−' rating from AM Best in November 2008. However, a month later on December 17, 2008, AM Best announced that New Castle Re's rating was under review when Citadel's funds experienced increased redemption requests as a result of the financial crisis. Two days later on December 19, it was reported that Citadel would not be renewing the rights in New Castle Re contracts, but that Torus Insurance Holdings in Bermuda would do so. In January 2009, Citadel placed New Castle Re into run-off.

Risk management 
The firm's risk management philosophy is focused on three main areas: risk capital allocation, stress exposure and liquidity management. Citadel's risk management center has 36 monitors displaying more than 50,000 instruments being traded within the firm's portfolios. The firm runs 500 stress tests each day to simulate the impact of potential economic and geopolitical crises or other market dislocation. Citadel aggregates investment positions on trading screens to calculate "more than 500 doomsday scenarios" to assess the potential of risk for the firm.

In 2014, Citadel rated an A grade for risk management in the annual Institutional Investor Hedge Fund Report Card.

In April 2015, Ben S. Bernanke, who was the United States Federal Reserve chairman for eight years, joined Citadel as a senior adviser on global economic and financial issues. In January 2017, Joanna Welsh became the Chief Risk Officer.

Former Citadel companies 
Citadel Solutions - Citadel's fund-administration arm.

Citadel Technology, established in 2009, was a wholly owned and independently operated affiliate of Citadel. It offers investment management technology, developed internally at Citadel, to a wide range of firms and funds. In 2013, Citadel Technology announced a partnership with REDI. The partnership combines Citadel's order management system (OMS) with REDI's execution management capabilities (EMS).

Corporate affairs

Citadel ownership 
In November 2006, Citadel became the second hedge fund to publicly issue bonds to investors in the form of senior unsecured debt totaling $2 billion, in an arrangement managed by Lehman Brothers and Goldman Sachs.

Employees 
The fund has become known for having one of the largest personnel turnovers in Chicago gaining the nickname of "Chicago's revolving door" and the New York Times reported "the firm is unique in its reputation for being a revolving door." It is also reported that turnover is aligned with the hedge fund industry.

In March 2015, Citadel received a Top 10 Great Workplaces in Financial Services ranking by the Great Places to Work Institute, based on a survey by Citadel employees.

Market advocacy 
Citadel has played an active role in regulatory affairs and has advocated for financial legislation on market structure. In 1999, Congress repealed a provision in the Glass-Steagall Act of 1933 that strictly separated banking and trading activities by financial firms. Griffin called dismantling that law "one of the biggest fiascos of all time". In the aftermath of the 2008 financial crisis, Griffin and Citadel called for greater transparency in derivatives trading, a stance at odds with many other hedge funds and major financial firms. The company spoke out against Wall Street for lobbying to delay the implementation of the Dodd–Frank Act. Griffin has also called for breaking up "too big to fail" banks and separating their banking and trading activities.

Following the 2014 publication of Flash Boys by Michael Lewis, who claimed financial markets are "rigged by large, high-speed traders" (also known as "high-frequency traders") Griffin, who was not interviewed by Lewis, shared his views on the book and its allegations during his second congressional hearing. Griffin said in front of the Senate Banking Committee that from his perspective "the U.S. equity markets are the fairest, most transparent, resilient and competitive markets in the world." Griffin expanded by saying that high-frequency trading functions to reconcile discrepancies between options tied to groups of stocks and the stocks themselves, saying, "Somebody has to keep the New York markets in line with the markets in Chicago. It all happens at an extremely low cost in the context of our capital markets". During an event at Georgetown University Griffin called the book "fiction".

Speaking fees paid
In 2014, former president Bill Clinton was paid $250,000 by Citadel to speak at New York restaurant Daniel to investors and employees in celebration of the Citadel's founders' 46th birthday.

In 2015, Citadel paid pop-star Katy Perry $500,000 to perform at an event celebrating the 25th anniversary of the firm.

Citadel paid over $800,000 in speaking fees to current secretary of the treasury Janet Yellen during 2018–2020 while she was not in office.

See also 
The Quants: How a New Breed of Math Whizzes Conquered Wall Street and Nearly Destroyed It
Merrill Lynch, Pierce, Fenner & Smith Inc. v. Manning, a 2016 Supreme Court case involving naked short selling claims against Citadel Derivative Group and Merrill Lynch, and others.

References

External links 
 Citadel LLC home page 
 Pictures of Citadel Center in Chicago 
 Data management agreement between Citadel and Accenture

Financial services companies established in 1990
Hedge funds
Companies based in Chicago
Hedge fund firms in Chicago
Investment management companies of the United States
Financial services companies based in Illinois